Marc Antoine Louis Claret de La Tourrette (11 August 1729, Lyon – 1 October 1793, Lyon) was a French botanist.  He corresponded with Rousseau and his official botanical abbreviation is Latourr.

Family
His father, Jacques-Annibal Claret de La Tourrette (1692–1776), belonged to Lyon's magistrature and was ennobled by Louis XV, and Marc's brother was the navigator Charles Pierre Claret de Fleurieu.

Life
In 1770 he published his Voyage au mont Pilat dans la province du Lyonnais, contenant des observations sur l'histoire naturelle de cette montagne. In this book he described the natural history of the Pilat massif and gave a list of the plants found there. 

In 1787, botanist Auguste Denis Fougeroux de Bondaroy published Tourrettia, which is a genus of flowering plants from South America, belonging to the family Bignoniaceae. It was named in Marc Antoine Louis Claret de La Tourrette's honor.

He died at Lyon.

Works
 Voyage au mont Pilat dans la province du Lyonnais, contenant des observations sur l'histoire naturelle de cette montagne, & des lieux circonvoisins ; suivi du catalogue raisonné des plantes qui y croissent. (Regnault, Avignon, 1770).
 Démonstrations élémentaires de botanique. (Chez Jean-Marie Bruyset, Lyon, 1773).

References

 Pierre Jacquet (1999). Un botaniste lyonnais méconnu du dix-huitième siècle : Marc-Antoine Claret de La Tourrette (1729–1793). Bulletin mensuel de la Société linnéenne de Lyon, 68 (4), pp. 77–84.
  "Éloge de M. de Fleurieu", by M. de Bory, 1776 in "Manuscrits de la bibliothèque de Lyon ou notices sur leur ancienneté, de Antoine-François Delandine"
  Almanach astronomique et historique de la ville de Lyon et des provinces, 1787, par Aimé de la Rohe, p. 88.

External links
 Genealogy on geneanet samlap 
 His page on the Fleurieu family site 

1729 births
1793 deaths
Scientists from Lyon
18th-century French botanists
Members of the French Academy of Sciences